The Dōshikai (lit. Fellow Thinkers' Association) was a political party in Japan.

History
The party was established in January 1960 by 11 members of the House of Councillors who had previously been members of the Ryokufūkai. It won only two seats in the House of Councillors election on 1 July 1962, and was reduced to seven seats in the chamber. As a result of losing its status as a "bargaining group" it merged with the Mushozoku Club members to form the Dai-Niin Club later in July.

References

Defunct political parties in Japan
Political parties established in 1960
1960 establishments in Japan
Political parties disestablished in 1962
1962 disestablishments in Japan